Horatius Ondedei (9 February 1630 – March, 1688) was a Roman Catholic prelate who served as Bishop of Urbania e Sant'Angelo in Vado (1684–1688).

Biography
Horatius Ondedei was born in Gubbio, Italy on 9 February 1630. He was ordained a deacon on 2 February 1684 and ordained a priest on 6 February 1684. On 10 April 1684, he was appointed during the papacy of Pope Innocent XI as Bishop of Urbania e Sant'Angelo in Vado. On 16 April 1684, he was consecrated bishop by Alessandro Crescenzi (cardinal), Cardinal-Priest of Santa Prisca, with Giacomo Altoviti, Titular Patriarch of Antioch, and Odoardo Cibo, Titular Archbishop of Seleucia in Isauria, serving as co-consecrators. He served as Bishop of Urbania e Sant'Angelo in Vado until his death in March 1688.

References 

17th-century Italian Roman Catholic bishops
Bishops appointed by Pope Innocent XI
1630 births
1688 deaths